Little Three is an album by Robin Holcomb, released in 1996.

Critical reception
The Village Voice called the album "both a return to the kind of rigorous composition Holcomb started out in and a proud shrug in the direction of pop accessibility." The New York Times noted that "simple religious and folk tunes coexist with the more complicated harmonies of impressionism." The Gazette wrote: "Unclassifiable 'serious' music for piano and occasional voice—Satie impressionism, American expressionism, Stephen Foster-like folk, and all of it beautiful, balanced and wise."

Track listing

Personnel 
William Clift – photography
Johnny Costa – art direction, design
Marion Ettlinger – photography
Robin Holcomb – vocals, piano
Brian Lee – mastering
Bob Ludwig – mastering
Judith Sherman – production
Jeanne Velonis – engineering
Paul Zinman – engineering

References 

1996 albums
Robin Holcomb albums
Nonesuch Records albums